Holcus (soft-grass or velvetgrass) is a genus of African and Eurasian plants in the oat tribe within the grass family.

Holcus species are used as food plants by the larvae of some Lepidoptera species including Coleophora lixella.

 Species
 Holcus annuus - Mediterranean and nearby areas from Portugal + Morocco to Caucasus
 Holcus azoricus - Azores - possibly a hybrid of H. lanatus and H. rigidus
 Holcus caespitosus - Sierra Nevada in southern Spain
 Holcus gayanus - Spain, Portugal
 Holcus grandiflorus - Spain
 Holcus × hybridus - France, Germany, British Isles  -- H. lanatus × H. mollis
 Holcus lanatus - Europe, Mediterranean + nearby areas from Iceland to Canary Is to Caucasus; naturalized in North + South America, Australia, New Zealand, East Asia, various  islands
 Holcus mollis - Algeria, Tunisia, most of Europe; naturalized in Australia, new Zealand, scattered locales in North America
 Holcus notarisii - Macedonia, Italy
 Holcus rigidus - Azores
 Holcus setiger - Cape Prov of South Africa

 formerly included
Several species now regarded as better suited to other genera; Andropogon Arrhenatherum Arundinella Bothriochloa Capillipedium Centotheca Chasmanthium Chrysopogon Deschampsia Heteropogon Hierochloe Pennisetum Pentameris Pseudoraphis Rostraria Sorghum Sporobolus Ventenata

References

Pooideae
Poaceae genera
Taxa named by Carl Linnaeus